The New Rockford Bridge near New Rockford, North Dakota is a Warren truss bridge structure that was built in 1904 over the James River.  It was listed on the National Register of Historic Places in 1997.

References

Road bridges on the National Register of Historic Places in North Dakota
Bridges completed in 1904
National Register of Historic Places in Eddy County, North Dakota
Warren truss bridges in the United States
1904 establishments in North Dakota